was a Japanese stage and film actress, best known for her appearances in the films of Yasujirō Ozu and Mikio Naruse from the late 1940s to the early 1960s.

Biography
Sugimura was born in Nishi-ku, Hiroshima. After the death of her parents, she was adopted at an early age by affluent lumber dealers, only learning much later that they were not her biological parents. (Sugimura reputedly claimed that she was the illegitimate child of a geisha.) Her adoptive parents took her to performances of both classical Japanese stage arts like kabuki and bunraku, and western ballet and opera. They also encouraged her to enroll at the Tokyo Ongaku Gakko (now Tokyo University of the Arts), where she failed the exams. She then joined the Tsukiji Shōgekijō (Tsukiji Little Theatre), Tokyo, in 1927, and later the Bungakuza theatre company, which she remained affiliated with from 1937 until her retirement in 1996.

She gave her film debut in 1932 in Eizo Tanaka's Namiko (1932). Between 1937 and the end of the war, she acted in about 20 films, including works by directors Yasujirō Shimazu and Shirō Toyoda. Notable post-war film appearances were in Keisuke Kinoshita's Morning for the Osone Family (1946) and in Ozu's Late Spring (1949). Her most important film roles included that of Shige, the elderly couple's hairdresser daughter in Ozu's Tokyo Story (1953), Naruse's Late Chrysanthemums (1954), and Tadashi Imai's An Inlet of Muddy Water (1953). For her film performances, she received the Blue Ribbon Award, the Kinema Junpo Award and the Mainichi Film Award.

On stage, she was successful as Blanche Dubois in A Streetcar Named Desire, Gertrude in Hamlet and Asako Kageyama in Yukio Mishima's Rokumeikan. Her most popular and often repeated stage role was Kei Nunobiki in Kaoru Morimoto's A Woman's Life, for which she received numerous awards, including the Japan Art Academy Prize and the Asahi Prize. In 1992, she was awarded the honorary citizenship of the city of Tokyo. In 1995, she refused the Order of Culture award. The same year saw the release of her last film, Kaneto Shindō's A Last Note.

Filmography

Film

 Namiko (1932)
 Asakusa no hi (1937)
 Uguisu (1938)
 Wedding Day (1940)
 Okumura Ioko (1940)
 Spring on Leper's Island (1940) – Yokogawa's wife
 Ōhinata-mura (1940)
 Waga ai no ki (1941)
 Shirasagi (1941)
 Jirō monogatari (1941)
 Nankai no hanataba (1942) – Nobuko Hotta
 Haha no chizu (1942) – Isano Kishi
 Gekiryu (1944)
 Army (1944) – Setsu
 Kanjōkai no bara (1945)
 Umi no yobu koe (1945)
 Ōsone-ke no ashita (1946) – Fusako Ōsone
 Urashima Tarō no kōei (1946)
 No Regrets for Our Youth (1946) – Madame Noge, Ryukichi's mother
 Yottsu no koi no monogatari (1947) – Yukiko's mother (episode 1)
 Joen (1947)
 Haru no mezame (1947)
 Sanbon yubi no otoko (1947) – Itoko
 Yuwaku (1948) – Tokie
 Te o tsunagu kora (1948)
 Idainaru X (1948) – Taka
 Toki no teizo: zengohen (1948)
 Kurogumo kaido (1948)
 Koku'un kaido (1948)
 Beni imada kiezu (1949)
 Yotsuya kaidan (1949) – Omaki
 Shinshaku Yotsuya kaidan: kōhen (1949) – Omaki
 Late Spring (1949) – Masa Taguchi
 Onna no shiki (1950)
 Until We Meet Again (1950) – Ono Suga
 Listen to the Voices of the Sea (1950) – Kohagi Nakamura
 Eriko to tomoni Part I + II (1951) – Harue Matsumura
 Jiyū gakkō (1951)
 Early Summer (1951) – Tami Yabe
 Fireworks Over the Sea (1951) – Kono Kujirai
 Repast (1951) – Matsu Murata, Michiyo's mother
 Inochi uruwashi (1951) – Mine Imura
 Seishun kaigi (1952) – Tamiyo
 Genroku suikoden (1952) – Onui
 Kaze futatabi (1952)
 Kin no tamago: Golden girl (1952) – Tsuruko Fujimura
 Wakai hito (1952)
 Senba zuru (1953) – Chikako Kurimoto
 Montenrupa: Bokyo no uta (1953)
 Kimi ni sasageshi inochi nariseba (1953)
 Tokyo Story (1953) – Shige Kaneko
 Life of a Woman (1953) – Tamae, Shintaro's mother
 An Inlet of Muddy Water (1953) – O-Hatsu (story 3)
 Geisha Konatsu (1954) – Raku Kamioka
 Late Chrysanthemums (1954) – Kin
 Shunkin monogatari (1954) – Oei
 Kunsho (1954)
 Meiji ichidai onna (1955) – Ohide
 Keisatsu Nikki (1955) – Moyo Sugita, a go-between
 Princess Yang Kwei-Fei (1955) – Princess Yen-chun
 Geisha Konatsu: Hitori neru yo no Konatsu (1955) – Raku Kamioka
 She Was Like a Wild Chrysanthemum (1955) – Masao's mother
 Aogashima no kodomotachi – Onna kyōshi no kiroku (1956) – Chie Yamada
 Early Spring (1956) – Tamako Tamura
 Yonjū-hassai no teikō (1956) – Satoko, Kotaro's wife
 Nagareru (1956) – Someka
 Onna no ashi ato (1956)
 The Crowded Streetcar (1957) – Otome, the mother
 Tokyo Twilight (1957) – Shigeko Takeuchi
 Kanashimi wa onna dakeni (1958) – Chiyoko
 Hana no bojō (1958) – Rie Ikegami
 Summer Clouds (1958) – Toyo
 Nemuri Kyōshirō burai hikae: Maken jigoku (1958) – Sonoe
 Good Morning (1959) – Kikue Haraguchi
 Bibō ni tsumi ari (1959) – Fusa Yoshino
 Anyakōro (1959) – Osai
 Kashimanada no onna (1959)
 The Three Treasures (1959) – Narrator
 Floating Weeds (1959) – Oyoshi
 Tenpō rokkasen – Jigoku no hanamichi (1960) – Okuma
 Musume tsuma haha (1960) – Kayo Tani
 Daughters, Wives and a Mother (1960) – Kayo Tani
 Ashi ni sawatta onna (1960) – Pickpocket Haruko
 Furyu fukagawata (1960)
 Banana (1960)
 Kutsukake Tokijirō (1961) – Oroku
 The End of Summer (1961) – Katou Shige
 Buddha (1961) – Vaidehi
 Hangyakuji (1961)
 Katei no jijō (1962) – Mrs. Yoshii
 Onna no za (1962) – Aki, Ishikawa-ke no gosai
 Ashita aru kagiri (1962)
 Musume to watashi (1962) – Kiyo Kitagawa
 The Outcast (1962) – School master's wife
 An Autumn Afternoon (1962) – Tomoko
 Kaigun (1963)
 Mother (1963) – Yoshie
 The Scent of Incense (1964) – Taromaru
 Akujo (1964) – Hatsu Mimura
 Kwaidan (1964) – Madame (story 4)
 Samurai Assassin (1965) – Tsuru
 With Beauty and Sorrow (1965) – Otoko's mother
 Red Beard (1965) – Kin, the madam
 Daikon to ninjin (1965)
 Dark the Mountain Snow (1966) – Ine's mother
 Jinchoge (1966) – Aki Ueno, Daphne
 Hanaoka Seishū no tsuma (1967) – Narrator
 Hitorikko (1969)
 Kaseki no mori (1973)
 Akumyo: shima arashi (1974) – Ito
 Kaseki (1974) – Mother-in-law
 Bokuto kidan (1992) – Kafu's mother
 A Last Note (1995) – Yoko Morimoto

Television (selected)
 Sekigahara (1981) - Kita no mandokoro

Awards (selected)
 1948: Japan Art Academy Prize for A Woman's Life
 1951: Blue Ribbon Awards for Best Supporting Actress for Repast and Early Summer
 1954: Mainichi Film Concours Best Supporting Actress for An Inlet of Muddy Water and Tokyo Story
 1968: Asahi Prize for A Woman's Life
 1974: Person of Cultural Merit
 1996: Mainichi Film Concours Best Actress for A Last Note
 1996: Kinema Junpo Awards for Best Actress for A Last Note
 1998: Mainichi Film Concours Special Award
 1998: Japanese Academy Prize Special Award

Notes

References

External links
 
 

1909 births
1997 deaths
Actors from Hiroshima
20th-century Japanese actresses
Persons of Cultural Merit